Corner Gas Animated is a Canadian adult animated sitcom, created by Brent Butt. The series is a revival of the live-action sitcom Corner Gas, which was originally broadcast from 2004 to 2009. The show premiered on April 2, 2018, on The Comedy Network, and was carried over when the channel became CTV Comedy Channel one year later.

The fourth and final season premiered on July 5, 2021.

Premise
The series follows the everyday lives of the residents of the small town of Dog River, Saskatchewan. Though similar to the live-action series, the creators acknowledged that the animated format gave them opportunities to do stranger and more unrealistic things that the original series could not depict. For instance, cutaway gags in the animated version include a Mad Max spoof and a gory fight between a Sasquatch and a unicorn.

Cast
All the original Corner Gas actors reprised their roles, with the exception of Janet Wright, who died in 2016. Actress Corrine Koslo was selected to voice Emma Leroy in Wright's place.

 Brent Butt as Brent Herbert Leroy
 Nancy Robertson as Wanda Dollard
 Eric Peterson as Oscar Leroy
 Corrine Koslo as Emma Leroy
 Fred Ewanuick as Richard Henry "Hank" Yarbo
 Gabrielle Miller as Lacey Burrows
 Lorne Cardinal as Sgt. Davis Quinton
 Tara Spencer-Nairn as Officer Karen Pelly 
 Cavan Cunningham as Fitzy
 Rebecca Shoichet as Shirley 
 Shannon Chan-Kent as 60's Girl #1, Alison, Lin, Lin hu, Bu-Hu, 
 Kathleen Barr as Dora, Mavis, Helen, Tina, Queen Bee, Pregnant Woman #1, Middle Aged Woman, Woman's Voice
 Brian Drummond as Zeke,  Impersonator #1, Man's Voice, News Broadcaster, Old Man Wilkie, Plasti-Potty Guy, Priest, Radio Announcer, Sasquatch, Trucker, Werewolf Guy, Ike
 Diana Kaarina as Kendra
 Vincent Tong as Audio Book Voice, Clown, Impersonator #2, Jason Steele, Kyle, Male Hipster, New Vacuum, Ravi, Won Hu
 Kevin Loring as Phil
 Omari Newton as Nate, Josh

Seasons overview

Season 1 (2018)

Season 2 (2019)

Season 3 (2020)

Season 4 (2021)

Production and broadcast
Corner Gas Animated was first announced in December 2016. In June 2018, CTV Comedy Channel renewed the series for a second season.

The second season premiered on July 1, 2019, and featured several Canadian and international celebrities appearing cameos and guest spots; including Michael J. Fox, Jann Arden, comedian Russell Peters, Prime Minister Justin Trudeau, astronaut Chris Hadfield and Epic Meal Time's Harley Morenstein.

In October 2019, the show was renewed for a third season. It was also announced, on October 3, that Amazon-owned IMDb TV would exclusively stream the Corner Gas catalogue, including Corner Gas Animated, starting on October 15.

In June 2021, Brent Butt announced that the fourth season, to premiere on July 5, would be the final season, as CTV had chosen not to continue it in the future.

Reception
The premiere episode of Corner Gas Animated, "Bone Dry", was The Comedy Network's highest premiere in history, with 360,300 viewers by that date. It was the number one entertainment program on April 2 in the demographics of A18-34, A18-49, and A25-54.

Awards and nominations

References

External links

 Official website
 

2010s Canadian adult animated television series
2010s Canadian animated comedy television series
2010s Canadian sitcoms
2010s Canadian workplace comedy television series
2020s Canadian adult animated television series
2020s Canadian animated comedy television series
2020s Canadian sitcoms
2020s Canadian workplace comedy television series
2018 Canadian television series debuts
2021 Canadian television series endings
Canadian adult animated comedy television series
Canadian animated sitcoms
English-language television shows
CTV Comedy Channel original programming
Police comedy television series
Television series by Bell Media
Television series set in restaurants
Television series set in shops
Television shows set in Saskatchewan